The 1902–03  season was the ninth in the history of Southern League. Southampton won Division One for the 5th time in seven seasons. Fulham finished top of Division Two. No Southern League clubs applied to join the Football League.

Division One

There were no new clubs in Division One this season.

Division Two

There were also no new clubs in Division Two this season.

Promotion-relegation test matches
At the end of the season, test matches were held between the bottom two clubs in Division One and the top two clubs in Division Two. Brentford beat Fulham 7-2 to retain their place in Division One, although Fulham were promoted anyway after Division One was expanded to 18 clubs. Brighton beat Watford 5-3 in the other match, which saw the two clubs swap divisions.

References

External links 
Southern League First Division Tables at RSSSF
Southern League Second Division Tables at RSSSF

1902-03
1902–03 in English association football leagues